Ionuț Răzvan Dumitru (born 6 November 1992) is a Romanian rugby union player. He plays mainly as a wing and occasionally as a centre for professional SuperLiga club Steaua and București based European Challenge Cup side the Wolves. Dumitru also plays for Romania's national team the Oaks.

Professional career
Ionuț Dumitru currently plays for Steaua București.

International career

Dumitru made his international debut in 2013 in the wing position against Russia. He played for Romania in the IRB Nations Cup and in their 2015 Rugby World Cup qualifying before appearing for them in their 2013 end of year tour.

References

External links

1992 births
Romanian rugby union players
Romania international rugby union players
Rugby union wings
CSA Steaua București (rugby union) players
Living people